Zarabi is a surname. Notable people with the surname include:

Abderraouf Zarabi (born 1979), Algerian footballer
Kheireddine Zarabi (born 1984), Algerian footballer, brother of Abderraouf